Mill's Methods are five methods of induction described by philosopher John Stuart Mill in his 1843 book A System of Logic. They are intended to illuminate issues of causation.

The methods

Direct method of agreement

For a property to be a necessary condition it must always be present if the effect is present. Since this is so, then we are interested in looking at cases where the effect is present and taking note of which properties, among those considered to be 'possible necessary conditions' are present and which are absent. Obviously, any properties which are absent when the effect is present cannot be necessary conditions for the effect. This method is also referred to more generally within comparative politics as the most different systems design.
Symbolically, the method of agreement can be represented as:
 A B C D occur together with w x y z
 A E F G occur together with w t u v
 ——————————————————
 Therefore A is the cause, or the effect, of w.
To further illustrate this concept, consider two structurally different countries. Country A is a former colony, has a centre-left government, and has a federal system with two levels of government. Country B has never been a colony, has a centre-left government and is a unitary state. One factor that both countries have in common, the dependent variable in this case, is that they have a system of universal health care. Comparing the factors known about the countries above, a comparative political scientist would conclude that the government sitting on the centre-left of the spectrum would be the independent variable which causes a system of universal health care, since it is the only one of the factors examined which holds constant between the two countries, and the theoretical backing for that relationship is sound; social democratic (centre-left) policies often include universal health care.

Method of difference

This method is also known more generally as the most similar systems design within comparative politics.

 A B C D occur together with w x y z
 B C D occur together with x y z
 ——————————————————
 Therefore A is the cause, or the effect, or a part of the cause of w.

As an example of the method of difference, consider two similar countries. Country A has a centre-right government, a unitary system and was a former colony. Country B has a centre-right government, a unitary system but was never a colony. The difference between the countries is that Country A readily supports anti-colonial initiatives, whereas Country B does not. The method of difference would identify the independent variable to be the status of each country as a former colony or not, with the dependant variable being supportive for anti-colonial initiatives. This is because, out of the two similar countries compared, the difference between the two is whether or not they were formerly a colony. This then explains the difference on the values of the dependent variable, with the former colony being more likely to support decolonization than the country with no history of being a colony.

Indirect method of difference

Also called the "Joint Method of Agreement and Difference", this principle is a combination of two methods of agreement. Despite the name, it is weaker than the direct method of difference and does not include it.

Symbolically, the Joint method of agreement and difference can be represented as:

 A B C occur together with x y z
 A D E occur together with x v w
 F G occur with y w
 ——————————————————
 Therefore A is the cause, or the effect, or a part of the cause of x.

Method of residue

If a range of factors are believed to cause a range of phenomena, and we have matched all the factors, except one, with all the phenomena, except one, then the remaining phenomenon can be attributed to the remaining factor.

Symbolically, the Method of Residue can be represented as:

 A B C occur together with x y z
 B is known to be the cause of y
 C is known to be the cause of z
 ——————————————————
 Therefore A is the cause or effect of x.

Method of concomitant variations

If across a range of circumstances leading to a phenomenon, some property of the phenomenon varies in tandem with some factor existing in the circumstances, then the phenomenon can be associated with that factor. For instance, suppose that various samples of water, each containing both salt and lead, were found to be toxic. If the level of toxicity varied in tandem with the level of lead, one could attribute the toxicity to the presence of lead.

Symbolically, the method of concomitant variation can be represented as (with ± representing a shift):

 A B C occur together with x y z
 A± B C results in x± y z.
 —————————————————————
 Therefore A and x are causally connected

Unlike the preceding four inductive methods, the method of concomitant variation doesn't involve the elimination of any circumstance. Changing the magnitude of one factor results in the change in the magnitude of another factor.

See also
Causal inference
Controlled scientific experiments
Baconian method
Bayesian network
Koch's postulates

References

Further reading

External links
Causal Reasoning—Provides some examples
Mill's methods for identifying causes—Provides some examples

Causality
Inductive reasoning
John Stuart Mill